JC Aragone and Marcos Giron were the defending champions but lost in the first round to Gong Maoxin and Hunter Reese.

Denis Kudla and Thai-Son Kwiatkowski won the title after defeating Sebastian Korda and Mitchell Krueger 6–3, 2–6, [10–6] in the final.

Seeds

Draw

References

External links
 Main draw

Oracle Challenger Series - Indian Wells - Men's Doubles
2020 Men's Doubles